Nová Ves pod Pleší is a municipality and village in Příbram District in the Central Bohemian Region of the Czech Republic. It has about 1,500 inhabitants.

References

Villages in Příbram District